Importin subunit alpha-5 is a protein that in humans is encoded by the KPNA1 gene.

Interactions
Importin subunit alpha-5 has been shown to interact with KPNB1 and UBR5.

References

Further reading

 

Armadillo-repeat-containing proteins